The 2021 Copa Chile (officially known as Copa Chile Easy 2021 due to its sponsorship), was the 41st edition of the Copa Chile, the country's national football cup tournament. The tournament began on 15 June 2021 during the mid-season break due to the 2021 Copa América and ended on 4 September 2021, with the final match on neutral ground. Colo-Colo were able to defend the title won in the previous edition of the competition, winning their thirteenth Copa Chile after beating Everton in the final by a 2–0 score.

Format 
The 2021 Copa Chile was based on a system of direct elimination with double-legged ties, similar to the Copa del Rey. In the first round, which was played with single-legged ties, clubs from the Primera B and Segunda División Profesional were paired against each other according to geographical criteria, where they played for 14 berths to the second round, in which the winners faced the Primera División clubs which joined the competition in that round. After the second round, and parallel to the Copa América, the round of 16 and the quarter-finals were played, with the semi-finals and final matches being played in late August and early September.

Prizes 
The champions of this edition (or the runners-up, if the champions had already qualified) were entitled to earn the right to compete in the 2022 Copa Libertadores, taking the Chile 4 berth, and also earned the right to play the 2022 Supercopa de Chile against the 2021 Campeonato Nacional champions.

Schedule

Teams 
45 clubs took part in this edition of the Copa Chile: 17 from the Primera División, 16 from the Primera B, and 12 from the Segunda División Profesional.

Primera A

 Audax Italiano
 Cobresal
 Colo-Colo
 Curicó Unido
 Deportes Antofagasta
 Deportes La Serena
 Deportes Melipilla
 Everton
 Huachipato
 Ñublense
 O'Higgins
 Palestino
 Santiago Wanderers
 Unión Española
 Unión La Calera
 Universidad Católica
 Universidad de Chile

Primera B

 Barnechea
 Cobreloa
 Coquimbo Unido
 Deportes Copiapó
 Deportes Iquique
 Deportes Puerto Montt
 Deportes Santa Cruz
 Deportes Temuco
 Fernández Vial
 Magallanes
 Rangers
 San Luis
 San Marcos de Arica
 Santiago Morning
 Unión San Felipe
 Universidad de Concepción

Segunda División

 Colchagua
 Deportes Colina
 Deportes Concepción
 Deportes Limache
 Deportes Recoleta
 Deportes Valdivia
 General Velásquez
 Iberia
 Independiente de Cauquenes
 Lautaro de Buin
 Rodelindo Román
 San Antonio Unido

First round 
The pairings for the first round were announced by the ANFP on 11 June 2021. The 12 teams from the Segunda División and two Primera B teams were drawn against the remaining 14 Primera B teams, according to geographical and safety criteria. Similar to the previous edition, ties in this round were single-legged, with the team from the lower tier hosting the match. Matches in this round were played on 15 and 16 June 2021.

Bracket

Second round 
The draw for the second round and subsequent phases was held on 15 June 2021. 16 Primera División teams (titleholders Colo-Colo received a bye to the round of 16) entered the competition at this stage and were drawn against the 14 first round winners. The team with the highest seed assigned in the draw hosted the second leg. The first legs were played from 21 to 30 June 2021, while the second legs were played from 25 June to 5 July 2021.

|}

First leg

Second leg

Round of 16 

|}

First leg

Second leg

Quarter-finals 

|}

First leg

Second leg

Semi-finals 

|}

First leg

Second leg

Final 
On 19 August 2021, ANFP confirmed that the 2021 Copa Chile final would be played on 4 September 2021 in Talca.

Top scorers 

Source: Campeonato Chileno

See also 
 2021 Chilean Primera División
 2021 Primera B de Chile

References 

Chile
2021
Copa Chile